Raptors de Naucalpan (English: Naucalpan Raptors) are an American football team based in Naucalpan, Mexico. The Raptors compete in the Liga de Fútbol Americano Profesional, the top American football league in Mexico. The team plays its home games at the Estadio José Ortega Martínez.

Despite never winning an LFA title, the Raptors are the only team to have reached playoffs every season.

History
The team was founded on 4 November 2015 and is one of the four charter members of the Liga de Fútbol Americano Profesional.

Rafael Duk era (2016–2017)
In their first season, the Raptors finished second in the league with a 4–2 regular season record, qualifying for the Tazón México I. The team, though, lost the league's championship 13–29 to the Mayas.

The Raptors led the North Division on the 2017 season, qualifying for playoffs with a 5–2 regular season record, led by League MVP, QB Bruno Márquez. In the divisional game, the team lost to the newcomers Dinos, despite their opponent having a losing record.

Guillermo Gutiérrez era (2018–present)
In 2018, Guillermo Gutiérrez replaced Rafael Duk as head coach. Also, the team switched from the Estadio Jesús Martínez "Palillo" to the Estadio José Ortega Martínez, in Naucalpan, State of Mexico. The Raptors qualified to the playoffs as second in the North Division with a 3–4 record. In a rematch of the 2017 game, Raptors defeated 21–6 Dinos in the divisional game, earning a spot in the Tazón México III. The team lost its second Tazón Mexico game, 0–17 to the Mexicas.

In 2019, the team dominated the North Division, finishing with a 6–2 (5–1 in the division) regular season record. After defeating the Fundidores in over time at the divisional game, Raptors qualified for their third Tazón México, and the second in a row. Raptors lost the championship against the Condors 16–20. This was the third Tazón Mexico loss for the team and the second in a row.

The 2020 season was cancelled due to the COVID-19 pandemic, the Raptors had a 4–1 record at the moment of the suspension of the season. The 2021 season was also cancelled.

In 2022 the Raptors finished the regular season as the fourth ranked team with a 4–2 record, qualifying to the playoffs, where they were eliminated by the Fundidores on the semifinal 27–30 with a touchdown pass from Shelton Eppler to Tavarious Battiste on the last play of the game.

Rivals

Dinos de Saltillo
The Dinos de Saltillo and the Raptors play each season the so-called Jurassic Duel (Spanish: Duelo Jurásico). Due to these teams being two of the strongest in the league in recent years, this rivalry is considered amongst LFA's most important rivalries.

Stadiums

In 2016, for the inaugural season of the LFA, all of the four founding teams (Condors, Eagles, Mayas and Raptors) played all their matches at the Estadio Jesús Martínez "Palillo", in the Magdalena Mixhuca Sports City.

For the 2018 season, Raptors moved from "Palillo" Martínez stadium to the Estadio José Ortega Martínez in Naucalpan, State of Mexico, the stadium has a capacity of 3,700 spectators and it is located inside the Universidad del Valle de México Lomas Verdes campus and it is regularly used by the university's college football team, the Linces.

In 2019, the team moved from the Estadio José Ortega Martínez to the field of the National Autonomous University of Mexico Acatlán campus, also located in Naucalpan and used by FES Acatlán's college football team: Pumas Acatlán. The cause of the movement has not been disclosed nor by the team or the league.

Raptors returned to the Estadio José Ortega Martínez for the 2020 season.

Despite the fact that the team is branded as being from Naucalpan, Raptors played their home matches for the two first seasons in Mexico City and they only moved to Naucalpan for the 2018 season.

Roster

Staff

Season-by-season

Awards
 North Division
 Champions (2): (2018, 2019)

References

Liga de Fútbol Americano Profesional teams
Sport in Naucalpan
American football teams established in 2015
Sports teams in the State of Mexico
2015 establishments in Mexico